
Gmina Stronie Śląskie is an urban-rural gmina (administrative district) in Kłodzko County, Lower Silesian Voivodeship, in south-western Poland, on the Czech border.

Neighbouring gminas
Gmina Stronie Śląskie is bordered by the gminas of Bystrzyca Kłodzka, Lądek-Zdrój and Międzylesie. It also borders the Czech Republic.

Villages
Apart from the town of Stronie Śląskie, the gmina contains the villages of Bielice, Bolesławów, Goszów, Janowa Góra, Kamienica, Klecienko, Kletno, Młynowiec, Nowa Biela, Nowa Morawa, Nowy Gierałtów, Popków, Rogóżka, Sienna, Stara Morawa, Stary Gierałtów, Strachocin and Stronie Wieś.

Twin towns – sister cities

Gmina Stronie Śląskie is twinned with:

 La Machine, France
 Staré Město, Czech Republic
 Dippoldiswalde, Germany
 Szikszó, Hungary
 Ustronie Morskie, Poland
 Chodzież, Poland

References

Stronie Slaskie
Kłodzko County